Ronald Aldon Hicks (born August 4, 1967) is an American prelate of the Roman Catholic Church who has been serving as bishop for the Diocese of Joliet in Illinois since 2020.  Hicks previously served as an auxiliary bishop of the Archdiocese of Chicago in Illinois from 2018 to 2020.

Biography

Early life 
Born on August 4, 1967, in Harvey, Illinois, Ronald Hicks grew up in South Holland, Illinois.  He was attending St. Jude the Apostle School in South Holland, Illinois when he started considering the priesthood.  Hicks later attended Quigley Preparatory Seminary South in Chicago.  After graduation, Hicks spent a year volunteering for the organization Nuestros Pequeños Hermanos (Our Little Brothers) at one of their orphanages in Mexico. Hicks earned a Bachelor of Arts degree from Loyola University Chicago and a Master of Arts degree from the University of Saint Mary of the Lake/Mundelein Seminary in Mundelein, Illinois.

Priesthood 
Hicks was ordained a priest by Cardinal Joseph Bernardin for the Archdiocese of Chicago on May 21, 1994.  His first posting after ordination was as an associate pastor at Our Lady of Mercy Parish in Aurora, Illinois, for two years.  He then served at St. Elizabeth Seton Parish in Orland Hills, Illinois, for three years. In 1999, Hicks was appointed as dean of formation at St. Joseph College Seminary in Chicago.

In 2005, Hicks moved to El Salvador to serve as regional director for Nuestros Pequeños Hermanos facilities in Latin America.  After five years there, Hicks returned to Illinois to become dean of formation at Mundelein Seminary.  On January 1, 2015, then Archbishop Blase J. Cupich appointed Hicks vicar general for the archdiocese.

Auxiliary Bishop of Chicago 
On July 3, 2018, Pope Francis appointed Hicks as titular bishop of Munatiana and auxiliary bishop for the Archdiocese of Chicago. On September 17, 2018, Hicks was consecrated by Cardinal Cupich, with Bishop Francis J. Kane and Bishop George J. Rassas serving as co-consecrators.

Bishop of Joliet 
On July 17, 2020, Pope Francis named Hicks as the bishop of the Diocese of Joliet. He was installed in the Cathedral of St. Raymond Nonnatus in Joliet on September 29, 2020; the congregation was limited to 20% of capacity because of the COVID-19 pandemic.

See also

 Catholic Church hierarchy
 Catholic Church in the United States
 Historical list of the Catholic bishops of the United States
 List of Catholic bishops of the United States
 Lists of patriarchs, archbishops, and bishops

References

External links
Roman Catholic Diocese of Joliet Official Site 
Roman Catholic Archdiocese of Chicago Official Site

 

1967 births
Living people
People from Harvey, Illinois
Catholics from Illinois
21st-century Roman Catholic bishops in the United States
Bishops appointed by Pope Francis